Black Boys Burning: The 1959 Fire at the Arkansas Negro Boys Industrial School is a 2017 non-fiction book by Grif Stockley, published by University Press of Mississippi. It is about the deadly fire at the Arkansas Negro Boys' Industrial School.

Contents
There are ten chapters in the book. The history of the institution along with the fire event and emergency services are in the first three chapters. The schooling in the institution is detailed in chapter four. The activism against anti-black practices in the state is detailed in chapter 5.

The book discusses the significant persons involved in the affair. According to the author, the fire became deadly due to neglect as a result of white supremacist sentiment, citing how Governor of Arkansas Orval Faubus deliberately underfunded the facility.

The book includes references that are indicated by endnotes.

Reception
Dionne Danns of Indiana University praised the "accessibly written book" and its "methodological lessons", the latter which she argued was the "greatest contribution".

References

Notes

Further reading

External links
 Black Boys Burning The 1959 Fire at the Arkansas Negro Boys Industrial School

2017 non-fiction books
Books about Arkansas
University Press of Mississippi books
1959 in Arkansas